Burchard Tuberflug, O.P. was a Roman Catholic prelate who served as Auxiliary Bishop of Konstanz (1471–?).

Biography
Burchard Tuberflug was ordained a priest in the Order of Preachers. On 18 September 1471, he was appointed during the papacy of Pope Sixtus IV as Auxiliary Bishop of Konstanz and Titular Bishop of Sebaste in Cilicia. On 22 September 1471, he was consecrated bishop by Šimun Vosić, Archbishop of Bar, with Benedictus, Titular Archbishop of Mitylene, and Giacomo, Bishop of Sant'Angelo dei Lombardi, serving as co-consecrators. It is uncertain how long he served; the next auxiliary bishop of record in the diocese was Daniel Zehender appointed in 1473.

References 

15th-century German Roman Catholic bishops
Bishops appointed by Pope Sixtus IV
Dominican bishops